Sirah is an Arabic, Sundanese and Javanese language of the word 'head'. It may refer to:

 Sirah (rapper), American rapper
 Sirah, Alborz, a village in Alborz Province, Iran
 Sirah, Khuzestan, a village in Khuzestan Province, Iran
 Prophetic biography (or Sīrah), an Arabic term used for the various traditional Muslim biographies of Muhammad
 Sīrah shaʿbiyyah, an Arabic term used for popular epics
 Durif (also known as Petite Sirah), a variety of red wine grape primarily grown in California
 Sirah, a character in "The Storyteller", an episode of Star Trek: Deep Space Nine

See also
 Sira (disambiguation)
 Sirrah (disambiguation)
 Syrah (also known as shiraz), a grape variety used for red wine